The  Australian Jazz Museum (AJM), incorporating the Victorian Jazz Archive (VJA), is located in Wantirna, Victoria. It is an incorporated association arising out of a meeting held in Sydney on 23 June 1996 to address the growing concern among the jazz community that the rich Australian jazz heritage was at risk of being lost.

The inaugural meeting of the Australian Jazz Museum was held at the then Whitehorse Hotel, Melbourne, on Sunday 18 August 1996.  Approximately sixty invitees including representatives from Adelaide, Canberra and Sydney attended.

The living MAP-accredited museum that is the Australian Jazz Museum is now achieving its goal to Proactively Collect, Archive & Disseminate Australian Jazz by collecting, exhibiting, preserving and storing on a "permanent basis all material and memorabilia of whatever nature pertaining to jazz music, performed and/or composed by Australian jazz musicians, covering the period from the 1920s through to the present day."

Accredited by the National Film and Sound Archive of Australia (NFSA) as being part of the national distributed collection of audio-visual material, AJM is also a member of the Australian Jazz Archive National Council (AJANC).

The Museum also has as part of its charter the further development of its collection by saving recordings of jazz produced outside Australia, to be used as a reference source.

In 2007 the Australian Jazz Museum received the Victorian Community History Awards (Best Exhibit / Display) for its Jazz Spans the Decades – A History of Jazz in Victoria exhibit.

Its extensive collection includes discs, audio cassettes, posters, books, photographs, instruments and ephemera includes works by such Australian Jazz luminaries as Graeme Bell, Bob Barnard, Ade Monsbourgh, Smacka Fitzgibbon and Frank Traynor together with magazines, periodicals and newspaper articles on Australian jazz musicians and many international performers.

The Australian Jazz Museum also houses the Australian Jazz Convention's extensive collection of material within its premises.

The Australian Jazz Museum is open to the public on Tuesdays and Fridays and also by appointment for tours of the facilities.  There is an extensive research library and the Australian component of the sound collection is listed on the Museum's Collections database.

See also 
 List of music museums

References

External links
 Australian Jazz Museum
 https://web.archive.org/web/20111218211356/http://www.victorianjazzclub.com/
 http://musicmemoriesproject.blogspot.com/2011/06/victorian-jazz-archive.html

Australian jazz
Music organisations based in Australia
Museums in Victoria (Australia)
Music museums in Australia